Warrioota Station is a pastoral lease that operates as a sheep station in South Australia.

The property shares a boundary with Nilpena Station and abuts Lake Torrens. The landscape consists of undulating saltbush and sandhill country interspersed with grassed flats.
 
In 1913 the property was owned by W. L. Whyte and Peter Whyte who both died the same year. The executors of their wills sold the  property to Walter Henry McFarlane. McFarlane placedit up for auction in 1920 when it was stocked with about 2,000 sheep and 270 cattle. T. H. Pearse of the Gums Station bought Warrioota for £10,000. Pearse appointed William Place as the station manager later the same year. The area had been going through a dry spell for the past few years but in 1921 the rains came with  falling in a single day. Pearse reported that abundant feed was available for stock by April of that year.

Grant Matheson purchased Warrioota from Pearse in 1923 for £11,000. Matheson also owned the adjoining property Nilpena station. Wild dogs had become troublesome so Matheson intended to construct many miles of vermin-proof fencing on the northern boundary. He was running about 15,000 sheep across the two properties.

The Nilpena Pastoral Company put both Nilpena and Warrioota up for auction in 1947 as one lot. The properties were divided into 14 sheep paddocks and watered by six wells and three bores. Both the stone homestead at Nilpena and the weatherboard homestead at Warrioota were included in the sale.

See also
List of ranches and stations

References

Pastoral leases in South Australia
Stations (Australian agriculture)
Far North (South Australia)